MBC Iraq is a TV channel for Iraqi viewers which was launched on 17 February 2019. The channel is owned by the Middle East Broadcasting Center.

Programming

Play 
Aleial kaburat
Fananees
Cocomelon
The School of the Misfits

History
MBC Iraq launched at 7:00 pm on 17 February 2019.

Shows include: Sahraya, Khas Jidden, Beit Beauty, Al Nahr Al Thalith, Wahed Zaed Wahed, Ailaty Tarbah (a spinoff from Family Feud), Ghayab Fi Bilad Al Ajayeb, KomaD, Tayba, Umm Badeela, Nasna, Hamid Helo, Dai Al Gomar, Bayn Ahelna, and other shows by other MBC channels are also shown on MBC Iraq.

Films 

MBC Iraq airs approximately one movie a day late at night, mostly Hollywood movies, with Arabic subtitles.

References

External links

Middle East Broadcasting Center
Mass media in Iraq
Arab mass media
Arabic-language television stations
Television channels and stations established in 2019